Minister for Trade and Industry may refer to:

 Minister for Trade and Industry (Ghana)
 Minister for Trade and Industry (New South Wales)
 Minister for Trade and Industry (Singapore)